The following lists events that happened during 1930 in Chile.

Incumbents
President of Chile: Carlos Ibáñez del Campo

Events

March
21 March – The Chilean Air Force is established.

Births 
15 February - Roberto Torretti (philosopher)
8 March – Braulio Musso
29 August – Gonzalo Vial Correa (d. 2009)

Deaths
16 July – Juan Luis Sanfuentes (b. 1858)
27 August – Evaristo Merino

References 

 
Years of the 20th century in Chile
Chile